Sudiat Dali  is a Singaporean former football midfielder who played for Singapore in the 1984 Asian Cup. He also played for Geylang International FC, and Singapore Lions in the Malaysia Cup tournament. He was known in his early career as 'Mike Hammer' (a popular novel and comic book character) for his tough tackling style of defending which also brings him caution or suspension from referees.

He coached the Nanyang Polytechnic football team in the Polytechnic-Institute of Technical Education Championship in 2009.
He is currently the coach of Jurong Junior College's football team.

References

External links
Stats
Profile at 11v11.com
Profile at Fifa.com

Singaporean footballers
Singapore international footballers
Living people
1962 births
Singapore FA players
1984 AFC Asian Cup players
Geylang International FC players
Footballers at the 1990 Asian Games
Southeast Asian Games bronze medalists for Singapore
Southeast Asian Games medalists in football
Association football midfielders
Competitors at the 1991 Southeast Asian Games
Asian Games competitors for Singapore